Gaspare Luigi Bertoni (9 October 1777 – 12 June 1853) was an Italian Roman Catholic priest and the founder of the Congregation of the Sacred Stigmata, also known as the Stigmatines.

Life
Gaspar Bertoni was born in Verona on 9 October 1777 to Francesco Bertoni (whose profession was the law) and Brunora Ravelli. His sister died when he was still a child.

Bertoni received his initial education from his parents. Bertoni later studied under the Jesuits and the Marian Congregation at Saint Sebastian's School in his hometown of Verona.

He commenced his studies for the priesthood in 1796. On 1 June 1796 - around the time of the French Revolution - troops from France began a two-decade occupation of the northern Italian cities. Bertoni joined the Gospel Fraternity for Hospitals and worked to help those wounded and ill while also focusing on those who were displaced or otherwise harmed due to the effects of the occupation. He was ordained as a priest on 20 September 1800.

Bertoni served as the chaplain to the Daughters of Charity, founded by Magdalene of Canossa, while also serving as the spiritual director of the seminary. He was also one of the leaders to offer prayers and support for Pope Pius VII when he was imprisoned by Napoleon Bonaparte. His pastoral work was marked with the establishment of the Marian Oratories and the devotion to the Five Wounds of Christ and establishment of schools to the poor. He founded the Congregation of the Sacred Stigmata of Our Lord Jesus Christ (the Stigmatines) on 4 November 1816. As of 2012 there were reported to be 94 houses with 422 members including 331 priests.

Bertoni was a rather frail and average looking man, beset with fevers and a continuing infection in his right leg during the last two decades of his life. Over 300 operations were performed on his leg in an effort to stem the infection. However he continued to serve as counselor and spiritual director from his hospital bed until his death in 1853. Gaspare Luigi Bertoni was buried in the Veronese church of the Stimmate.

Veneration

Venerable
The sainthood process commenced in Verona with an informative process and the collation of his writings. Theologians approved them as being in line with the magisterium in a decree of 9 August 1905. The introduction of the cause came on 2 March 1906 under Pope Pius X in which he was accorded the title of Servant of God as the first formal stage in the process. The apostolic process was held not long after this. Both processes were validated on 18 December 1929 in Rome at the discretion of the Congregation of Rites.

On 15 December 1966 he was proclaimed to be Venerable after Pope Paul VI acknowledged his life of heroic virtue.

Beatification
The process for the miracle needed for his beatification commenced in 1946 and concluded in 1950 after which the process was validated in Rome on 11 November 1967. Pope Paul VI approved it on 3 October 1975 and beatified Bertoni on 1 November 1975.

The miracle involved the cure of Giuseppe Anselmi - a priest of the Stigmatines - who had severe stomach complications and was cured in Brasilia on 28 May 1937.

Canonization
The second miracle required for sanctification received validation from the Congregation for the Causes of Saints on 30 November 1984 while it received the papal approval of Pope John Paul II at the beginning of 1989. He canonized Bertoni on 1 November 1989.

References

External links
 Kasper Bertoni
Saints.SQPN: Gaspar Bertoni
Catholic Online: Gaspar Bertoni

1777 births
1853 deaths
18th-century Christian saints
18th-century venerated Christians
18th-century Italian Roman Catholic priests
19th-century Christian saints
19th-century venerated Christians
19th-century Italian Roman Catholic priests
Beatifications by Pope Paul VI
Canonizations by Pope John Paul II
Founders of Catholic religious communities
Italian Roman Catholic saints
Religious leaders from Verona
Venerated Catholics